are those words in the Japanese language composed of Chinese morphemes but invented in Japan rather than borrowed from China. Such terms are generally written using kanji and read according to the on'yomi pronunciations of the characters. While many words belong to the shared Sino-Japanese vocabulary, some kango do not exist in Chinese while others have a substantially different meaning from Chinese; however some words have been borrowed back to Chinese.

Meiji era
Towards the end of the 19th century, many of these terms were re-imported into Chinese. Some consider that as the form of the words entirely resembles that of native Chinese words in most cases, Chinese speakers often fail to recognize that they were actually coined in Japan. However, some scholars argue that many of those terms, which were considered as Wasei-kango by some people, were in fact created by Chinese and Western scholars. During the 19th century, officials from Japan had been purchasing Sino-English dictionaries such as "A Dictionary of the Chinese Language (1822)", "An English and Chinese Vocabulary in Court Dialect (1844)" and "Vocabulary and Handbook of the Chinese Language (1872)" from China in order to absorb Western civilization.

History

Pre-Meiji period 

Since antiquity, the Japanese have supplemented their native vocabulary, known as yamato kotoba, by borrowing many words from Chinese. After integrating the Chinese words into their vocabulary, they began creating their own kango.

One source of wasei-kango is the reinterpretation of yamato kotoba via on'yomi readings of the characters as opposed to the original kun'yomi. For example, the archaic word for Japan,  ( Hinomoto), has become the modern  ( Nihon or  Nippon). Another example is the word for daikon, which changed from  ōne to  daikon. Sometimes, an inversion of the character order is necessary, as in the construction of  rippuku from  hara ga tatsu, for anger. Terms have also been coined for concepts in Japanese culture such as geisha, ninja, or kaishaku.

Meiji Restoration 

As Western influence began to take hold in Japan during the 19th-century Meiji Restoration, Japanese scholars discovered that they needed new words to translate the concepts imported from Europe. As Natsume Sōseki once wrote in his diary,

or in English, "Law governs the human world as the natural world." Eventually, once these European concepts became fully naturalized in the Japanese worldview, it became possible to write the above sentence as it would be in modern Japanese:

Japanese officials and scholars also imported new terms coined by Chinese and Western scholars from Sino-English dictionaries from China. Many of these terms are still commonly being used by both countries nowadays.

Sometimes, existing words were repurposed to translate these new concepts. The majority of wasei-kango were created during this period. Following the Meiji Restoration and the Japanese victory in the First Sino-Japanese War, many of these terms found their way into the modern Chinese, Korean and Vietnamese languages, where they remain today.

See also 

 Classical compounds in English and other Indo-European languages
 Wasei-eigo

Notes

References 

Robert Morrison "A Dictionary of the Chinese Language" (1822): 使徒, 審判, 法律, 醫學, 自然的, 新聞, 精神, 単位, 行為, 言語
Samuel Wells Williams "An English and Chinese Vocabulary in Court Dialect" (1844): 內閣, 選舉, 新聞紙, 文法, 領事
Walter Henry Medhurst "English and Chinese Dictionary" (1847-1848): 知識, 幹事, 物質, 偶然, 教養, 天主, 小說, 本質
Wilhelm Lobscheid "English and Chinese Dictionary, with Punti and Mandarin Pronunciation" (1866-1869): 蛋白質, 銀行, 幻想, 想像, 保險, 文學, 元帥, 原理, 右翼, 法則, 戀愛、讀者
Justus Doolittle "Vocabulary and Handbook of the Chinese Language" (1872): 電報, 電池, 光線, 分子, 地質論, 物理, 動力, 光學, 國會, 函數, 微分學

Japanese vocabulary
Kanji